Dear Thomas is a 2021 German biographical film directed by Andreas Kleinert. It is based on the life of German author, poet and film director Thomas Brasch.

Cast
 Albrecht Schuch - Thomas Brasch
 Peter Kremer - Thomas Brasch (age 56)
 Anja Schneider - Gerda Brasch
 Jella Haase - Katharina Thalbach
 Ioana Iacob - Sanda Weigl
 Jörg Schüttauf - Horst Brasch

References

External links 

2020s biographical films
German biographical films
German black-and-white films